The 2006–07 Football League Championship (known as the Coca-Cola Championship for sponsorship reasons) was the third season of the league under its current title and fifteenth season under its current league division format.

The Football League is contested through three Divisions. The top divisions of these is the League Championship. The winner and the runner up of the League Championship will be automatically promoted to the Premiership and they will be joined by the winner of the League Championship playoff. The bottom three teams in the Championship will be relegated to the second division, League One.

Sunderland finished top of the league with 88 points, closely followed by Birmingham City who had 86 points.
Derby County were promoted through the play-offs. Southend United, Luton Town and Leeds United were relegated.

Changes from last (2005–06) season

Stadia and locations

See the map on the right

From Championship
Promoted to Premier League
 Reading (1st)
 Sheffield United (2nd)
 Watford (3rd Play-offs)

Relegated to League One
 Crewe Alexandra (22nd)
 Millwall (23rd)
 Brighton & Hove Albion (24th)

To Championship
Relegated from Premier League
Birmingham City (18th)
West Bromwich Albion (19th)
Sunderland (20th)

Promoted from League One
 Southend United (1st)
 Colchester United (2nd)
 Barnsley (3rd Play-offs)

League table

Results

Top scorers

Play-offs
Semi-finals

|}
Final

References

 
EFL Championship seasons
1
Eng
2